KVDO-LP, UHF analog channel 25, was a low-powered television station serving Houston, Texas, United States that was licensed to Clear Lake. Owned by Far Eastern Telecasters, the station carried a commercial-free format of older music videos which was simulcast on the Internet via live streaming on kvdo.net. The station signed off the air on June 3, 2014 with an outstanding construction permit for digital channel 29.

History

The station originally broadcast on channel 69, but over the years as digital television came online, moved to channel 59 and then channel 25. Its facilities were destroyed by Hurricane Rita in 2005. It intended after the storm to build digital facilities on channel 25 from the Missouri City tower farm; this application was declined by the Federal Communications Commission (FCC) due to probable interference with KCTL-LD in Livingston, along with KFDM in Beaumont. They instead chose to move their digital facilities to channel 29, though the facilities were never built.

The station reported to the FCC that it had gone off the air November 10, 2009. The FCC canceled the station's license September 19, 2011 for violating the Communications Act of 1934 by failing to broadcast during a consecutive 12-month period. However, the station successfully appealed the cancellation, and the license was reinstated on November 14, 2011.

The station's owners surrendered the license for KVDO-LP to the FCC on June 2, 2014, and the FCC canceled the license on June 9, 2014. The music video format continues on the station's former website, albeit using a random playlist cueing existing videos on YouTube.

References

VDO-LP
Defunct television stations in the United States
Television channels and stations established in 1985
1985 establishments in Texas
Television channels and stations disestablished in 2014
2014 disestablishments in Texas
VDO-LP